Cid Ferreira Gomes (born 27 April 1963) is a Brazilian politician who serves as a Senator for the state of Ceará since 2019. He is a member of the Democratic Labour Party (PDT) since 2015, and is the brother of fellow Brazilian politician Ciro Gomes.

Gomes is the former Governor of Ceará. During his governorship, his vice governor was Francisco José Pinheiro. On 1 January 2015 he was named Minister of Education of Brazil in the cabinet of Dilma Rousseff, and served until 18 March of that same year. On 19 February 2020, Gomes was shot after using a bulldozer to remove a barricade built by a group of masked military police officers during an illegal demonstration in Sobral, Ceará.

References

1963 births
Governors of Ceará
Living people
People from Sobral, Ceará
Mayors of places in Brazil
Education Ministers of Brazil
Democratic Labour Party (Brazil) politicians
Shooting survivors
Federal University of Ceará alumni
20th-century Brazilian politicians
21st-century Brazilian politicians